George Dustan (12 June 1900 – 27 July 1951) was a South African sprinter. He competed in three events at the 1924 Summer Olympics.

References

External links
 

1900 births
1951 deaths
Athletes (track and field) at the 1924 Summer Olympics
South African male sprinters
Olympic athletes of South Africa
Sportspeople from Cape Town
Cape Colony people